The second series of The Great British Bake Off started 14 August 2011 with twelve amateur bakers.  Unlike series one, the competition was held in a single location – the grounds of Valentines Mansion, a 17th-century mansion house in Redbridge. In addition to their on-screen presenting, Mel Giedroyc and Sue Perkins also took over the narration, which had been done by Stephen Noonan for the previous series. Series two also introduced the "star baker" award for the most impressive performer each week.

Three and a half thousand people applied for the competition, and twelve were selected. Each episode was filmed over two fourteen-hour days. The competition was won by Joanne Wheatley.

Bakers

Results summary 

 There was no Star Baker this week, as Paul and Mary felt it wouldn't be right to single out one baker when the results were incredibly close.

Colour key:

Episodes

Episode 1: Cakes 
For their first challenge, the bakers were asked to bake 24 cupcakes in two hours. They were allowed to make two different types of cupcakes. For the technical challenge, the bakers were asked to bake a Coffee and Walnut Battenburg cake using Mary Berry's recipe in two hours. The cake needed to have the perfect sponge which held its form (perfect symmetry), distinguish flavours, and a smooth exterior. For the showstopper, the bakers were asked to bake a chocolate tiered celebration cake with elaborate, multi-layer design in five hours.

During the Showstopper round, Rob accidentally dropped his cake.

Episode 2: Tarts 
For the signature bake, the bakers were asked to bake a savory Quiche in 2 hours. For the technical challenge, the bakers were asked to bake a Tarte au Citron using Mary's recipe in  hours. For the showstopper, the bakers were asked to bake 24 mini sweet tarts.

Episode 3: Bread 
For their signature bake, the bakers were asked to bake a free formed flavored loaf (not using a tin) in 3 ¼ hours. For the technical challenge, the bakers were given  hours to bake a Focaccia, using Paul's recipe. For the showstopper, the bakers were asked to bake 2 displays. One display is to make a basket out of bread. The second display is to make 12 sweet and 12 savory rolls. They had 5 hours.  

In this episode, two bakers were eliminated rather than one baker.

Episode 4: Biscuits 
For the signature bake, the bakers were give  hours to make 12 biscuits. The biscuits should not be too hard or too crumbly. For the technical challenge, the bakers were given  hours to bake 24 brandy snaps. For the showstopper, the bakers were asked to bake a macaron display. They need 3 different flavors, bake 120 of them, and had 5 hours to complete it.

Episode 5: Pies  
For the signature, the bakers were asked to bake a family pie with either a ruff puff pastry or flaky pastry in  hours. For the technical challenge, the bakers were asked to bake a batch of 6 miniature pork pies in  hours using Paul's recipe. The technical was a 2-day bake challenge, so the bakers were judged the next day. For the showstopper, the bakers were asked to bake a meringue pie—a fruit and/or custard pie topped with meringue, in 3 ½ hours. 

Once again, in this episode, two bakers were eliminated instead of one baker.

Episode 6: Desserts 
For the signature bake, the bakers were asked to bake a cheesecake in  hours. For the technical challenge, the bakers were asked to bake a chocolate roulade in 1 3/4 hours using Mary's recipe. For the showstopper, the bakers were asked to create a Croquembouche-inspired bake in 5 hours.

Episode 7: Pâtisserie (Semi-final)  
For the signature bake, the semi finalists were asked to bake a layered mousse cake in 2 hours, with the judges seeking a light sponge and a rich mousse. For the technical challenge, the bakers were asked to bake 12 identical Iced Fingers. Using Paul's recipe, they were to be filled with cream and jam. For the showstopper, the bakers were asked to bake 3 types of pastries. The bakers had to use the same dough — which must be crisp on the outside and soft on the inside — for all three.

In this episode, none of the bakers were individually highlighted as Star Baker, as the judges decided all four deserved commendation for reaching the semi-final.

Episode 8: Final 
For their final signature bake, the finalists were asked to bake 12 mille-feuille in  hours. For the technical challenge, the bakers were asked to bake a sachertorte in 2 hours and 40 minutes. For their final showstopper, the bakers were asked to bake 3 different types of petits fours: Meringue, Sweet Pastry, and Sponge Based, within 4 hours.

Extras and special episodes 
Both episodes nine and ten were masterclasses by Paul and Mary, where they demonstrated how to make the Technical Challenges that they had set throughout the series. Episode nine showed the first four of the series; Coffee and walnut Battenberg, Tarte au Citron, Focaccia and Brandy Snaps. Episode ten showed the last four of the series; Pork pies, Chocolate roulade, Iced fingers and Sachertorte.
Episode eleven went back and revisited the bakers from series one to catch up with the contestants.

Post-show career
Some of the contestants went on to a career in baking or had a change of career after appearing on the show.

Joanne Wheatley has written two bestselling books on baking, A Passion for Baking published on 16 May 2013, and Home Baking initially as a Sainsbury's exclusive.  She writes a monthly column for Sainsbury's magazine and is a regular guest columnist for The Sun newspaper. She runs cookery courses from her home in Essex, and has appeared in various television programmes such as The Alan Titchmarsh Show and What's Cooking.

Holly Bell teaches baking classes and for a time worked as an occasional radio presenter on BBC Radio Leicester. She also appeared as a guest presenter on QVC shopping channel.  She wrote an eBook called Ready, Steady, Bake! which was published on 5 July 2012, and published a book Recipes from a Normal Mum on 17 July 2014.

Mary-Anne Boermans wrote a book on baking, Great British Bakes: Forgotten Treasures for Modern Bakers, which was published on 7 November 2013.

Ratings
Official episode viewing figures are from BARB.

Specials

References

External links
 

Series 2
2011 British television seasons